The 1988 NCAA Division II men's basketball tournament involved 32 schools playing in a single-elimination tournament to determine the national champion of men's NCAA Division II college basketball as a culmination of the 1987–88 NCAA Division II men's basketball season. It was won by the University of Lowell (now the University of Massachusetts Lowell), and Lowell's Leo Parent was the Most Outstanding Player.

Regional participants

*denotes tie

Regionals

New England - New Haven, Connecticut 
Location: Charger Gymnasium Host: University of New Haven

Third Place - Quinnipiac 88, Assumption 73

Great Lakes - Owensboro, Kentucky 
Location: Owensboro Sportscenter Host: Kentucky Wesleyan College

Third Place - Lewis 89, Ashland 73

South - Lakeland, Florida 
Location: Jenkins Field House Host: Florida Southern College

Third Place - North Alabama 87, Norfolk State 76

South Central - Cape Girardeau, Missouri 
Location: Show Me Center Host: Southeast Missouri State University

Third Place - South Dakota State 87, Angelo State 84

North Central - Saint Cloud, Minnesota 
Location: Halenbeck Hall Host: St. Cloud State University

Third Place - St. Cloud State 118, Augustana 114**

West - Hayward, California 
Location: Physical Education Complex Host: California State University, Hayward

Third Place - Cal State Bakersfield 90, Sacramento State 89

South Atlantic - Richmond, Virginia 
Location: Arthur Ashe, Jr. Athletic Center Host: Virginia Union University

Third Place - Virginia Union 90, Virginia State 89

East - Erie, Pennsylvania 
Location: Hammermill Center Host: Gannon University

Third Place - Le Moyne 89, Kutztown 81

*denotes each overtime played

National Quarterfinals

National Finals - Springfield, Massachusetts
Location: Springfield Civic Center Hosts: American International College and Springfield College

Third Place - Florida Southern 94, Troy State 84
*denotes each overtime played

All-tournament team
 Jerry Johnson (Florida Southern)
 Bobby Licare (Lowell)
 Leo Parent (Lowell)
 Averian Parrish (Alaska–Anchorage)
 Darryl Thomas (Troy State)

See also
 1988 NCAA Division II women's basketball tournament
 1988 NCAA Division I men's basketball tournament
 1988 NCAA Division III men's basketball tournament
 1988 NAIA men's basketball tournament

References

Sources
 2010 NCAA Men's Basketball Championship Tournament Records and Statistics: Division II men's basketball Championship
 1988 NCAA Division II men's basketball tournament jonfmorse.com

NCAA Division II men's basketball tournament
Tournament
NCAA Division II basketball tournament
NCAA Division II basketball tournament